Hernandes Quadri Junior (born 8 December 1967) is a retired male road cyclist from Brazil. He represented his native country at the 1992 Summer Olympics and the 1996 Summer Olympics.

Career
Quadri won the team pursuit silver medal and the bronze in points race in the 2002 Pan American Championships.

Palmares

1992
1st in General Classification Volta Ciclistica Internacional de Santa Catarina (BRA)
1995
1st in General Classification Volta Ciclistica Internacional de Santa Catarina (BRA)
1st in Prova Ciclística 9 de Julho (BRA)
1997
3rd in General Classification Vuelta Ciclista del Uruguay (URU)
1999
1st in Circuito Boavista (BRA)
2002
1st in Volta Do ABC Paulista (BRA)
2003
2nd in Stage 2 Volta de Goias (BRA)
1st in  National Championship, Road, Elite, Brazil (BRA)

References

External links
 

1967 births
Living people
Brazilian male cyclists
Brazilian road racing cyclists
Cyclists at the 1992 Summer Olympics
Cyclists at the 1996 Summer Olympics
Olympic cyclists of Brazil
Cyclists at the 2007 Pan American Games
Sportspeople from Paraná (state)
Pan American Games medalists in cycling
20th-century Brazilian people
21st-century Brazilian people
Pan American Games bronze medalists for Brazil
Medalists at the 1995 Pan American Games